Fish Fry is a 1944 Andy Panda cartoon directed by James Culhane, and produced by Walter Lantz Productions. The plot centers around a street cats endless attempts to eat Andy's goldfish after ordering it from a pet shop.

Plot
Andy Panda is fascinated by a cute little goldfish in a pet shop window, buys it, and starts to take it home. However he's stalked by a mangy, hungry alley cat who tries to eat it. The big tomcat tries to get the baby fish by sneaking up and grabbing it, then by disguising himself as a thirst-crazed desert traveler dying for a drink of water, and finally, by crude by effective brute force. Andy's stuck in the middle of a guerrilla war between the ravenous cat and the goldfish. Guess who's more sadistic? In his haste, the cat loses the fish down the gutter, but retrieves it, only to lose it again. Andy catches the fish and is promptly chases back to the pet shop. The cat's ambush outside the shop is foiled by a big bulldog at Andy's side who disposes of the cat without lifting an eyebrow.

Notes
Production Number: D-6
The cartoon was nominated for the 1944 Academy Award for Best Animated Short Film, but lost to MGM's Mouse Trouble, Starring Tom and Jerry.
Andy Panda never speak in this cartoon, though Walter Tetley provides the line, "Poor little pussy cat" for the goldfish.

Home Media 
Woody Woodpecker and His Friends: The Screwdriver (VHS; Goodtimes)
Woody Woodpecker and His Friends: Volume 2 (VHS and Laserdisc; Universal/MCA)
Woody Woodpecker and Friends: Volume 4 (DVD; Columbia House)
The Woody Woodpecker and Friends Classic Cartoon Collection (DVD; Universal/MCA)
Woody Woodpecker Favorites (DVD; Universal/MCA)

References

External links

1944 animated films
1944 films
1940s American animated films
Andy Panda films
Films directed by James Culhane